Reed Shuldiner is the Alvin L. Snowiss Professor of Law at the University of Pennsylvania Law School, and Co-Director of the Center for Tax Law and Policy.

Biography

Shuldiner has a bachelor of science in engineering degree from Princeton University (1977), a juris doctor degree from Harvard University Law School (1983), and a doctor of philosophy degree in economics from Massachusetts Institute of Technology (1985). From 1984 to 1986 he was an associate at Wilmer, Cutler & Pickering.

Shuldiner is the Alvin L. Snowiss Professor of Law at the University of Pennsylvania Law School, and Co-Director of the Center for Tax Law and Policy.

Among his writings are "A Comprehensive Wealth Tax," with David Shakow, 53 Tax Law Rev. 499 (2000), "Indexing the Federal Income Tax," 48 Tax Law Review 537 (1993), and "A General Approach to the Taxation of Financial Instruments," 71 Texas Law Review 243 (1992).

References 

Living people
American legal scholars
Scholars of tax law
Princeton University alumni
MIT School of Humanities, Arts, and Social Sciences alumni
Harvard Law School alumni
University of Pennsylvania Law School faculty
Wilmer Cutler Pickering Hale and Dorr associates
Year of birth missing (living people)